"The Weary Kind" (full title "The Weary Kind (Theme from Crazy Heart)") is a country song written by Ryan Bingham and T Bone Burnett for the film Crazy Heart, a 2009 film directed by Scott Cooper starring Jeff Bridges and Maggie Gyllenhaal. Colin Farrell and Bridges perform renditions of the song in the film. Bingham and his Dead Horses serve as Bridges' backing band in the film.

The official version on the soundtrack album Crazy Heart: Original Motion Picture Soundtrack is performed by Ryan Bingham. Jeff Bridges sang a live version during his interview with Peter Travers on ABC News Now. The song was later included as the last track on Bingham's 2010 album Junky Star.

Awards and nominations

Chart performance

References

External links
 – discussion with  Ryan Bingham, T-Bone Burnett, and film's director Scott Cooper (uploaded to YouTube by the film's studio, Fox Searchlight Pictures)
  (uploaded to YouTube by the film's studio, Fox Searchlight Pictures)

2009 songs
Ryan Bingham songs
Best Original Song Academy Award-winning songs
Best Original Song Golden Globe winning songs
Grammy Award for Best Song Written for Visual Media
Songs written by T Bone Burnett